The map of Iran, in the Afsharid era of the year 1747, was drawn by Emanuel Bowen the British geographer and monographer. This map shows the boundaries and the extent of Afsharid Iran. Apart from displaying the name of the Persian Gulf, the map also has the names of many regions, cities, lakes and seas which were parts of Iran at that time.

Description of the names of the northern and southern seas of Iran 
The map calls the sea in the north of Iran the Caspian Sea and the one in the south the Persian Gulf. The water zone, today called the Arabian Sea, is written as Persian sea and what is today Iran's south east county of Sistan and Baluchestan Province is named as Makran province. Today's central province of Fars is mentioned as Farsistan.

Drawings 
Next to the map's description at the bottom, there are some drawings which show the following:

1.A large 12 horse carriage carrying a large room.

2.A person riding on a Camel carriage 

3.Four men, one with a sword on his waist and a spear in his hand, another carries a bow and arrow with the third holding an arrow in his hand.

4.Standing horse.

Neighbors 
Iran's eastern neighbor in the map is the Mughal Empire. The Samarqand Empire and Balkh Kingdom are to the northeast, the Kharazm province and Uzbeks are in the north, and the Black Sea and Ottoman Empire are in the north and west respectively.

References

International disputes
Alternative place names
Naming controversies
Afsharid Iran
Iranian dynasties
History of Central Asia
Persian Gulf
Maps
Iran
History maps
Historical geography of Iran